Denmark competed at the 2002 Winter Paralympics in Salt Lake City, United States. One competitor from Denmark won no medals and so did not place in the medal table.

See also 
 Denmark at the Paralympics
 Denmark at the 2002 Winter Olympics

References 

Denmark at the Paralympics
2002 in Danish sport
Nations at the 2002 Winter Paralympics